Victor C. Prinzi (April 28, 1936 - January 14, 1998) was a professional American football player for the New York Giants and the Denver Broncos and  did color commentary with Gene Deckerhoff for FSU football games.  He was also a friend and former college football (starting quarterback and defensive back) teammate of Burt Reynolds at Florida State University, after whom a character in The Cannonball Run was named.  Vic Prinzi died after a four-month battle with lung cancer on January 14, 1998 at his home in Tampa, Florida.

See also
 United States Football League on the radio

References

External links
 Vic Prinzi at the official site of the Seminoles, the Florida State University American football team.
 . Ex-Seminoles Broadcaster, QB Dies
 Sports-Reference Page

1936 births
1998 deaths
Deaths from cancer in Florida
Denver Broncos players
Florida State Seminoles football announcers
Florida State Seminoles football players
New York Giants players